It's Good to Be Alive is the second album by American singer and songwriter D. J. Rogers, released in 1975. Produced and written by D. J. Rogers, this was his debut album for RCA. The song "Say You Love Me" became a minor hit on both the R&B and pop charts, and arguably Rogers' signature song.

Track listing
All tracks composed and arranged by D. J. Rogers
"Hold On, Be Strong"  3:28 	
"It's Good to Be Alive"  3:22 	
"Faithful to the End"  3:53 	
"Love Will See You Through"  3:24 	
"Say You Love Me"  5:41 	
"(It's Alright Now) Think I'll Make It Anyhow"  2:56 	
"If You Didn't Love Me (Don't Go Away)" 4:00 	
"Living Is All That Matters"  3:18 	
"Love You Forever"  3:30 	
"Bula Jean"  5:27

Personnel
D. J. Rogers - lead vocals, Wurlitzer electric piano, concert grand piano, Cordovox piano, Clavinet, mixing
Keith Hatchell - bass
Michael McGloiry - guitar
Paul Smith - organ, Wurlitzer electric piano
[Uncredited musician] - drums
Technical
Hank McGill - recording, mixing

Charts

Singles

References

External links
 D. J. Rogers-It's Good To Be Alive at Discogs

1975 albums
D. J. Rogers albums
RCA Records albums